Events from the year 1499 in Ireland.

Incumbent
Lord: Henry VII

Events

Births
 Stephen Lynch fitz James, future Mayor of Galway (on three occasions).

Births

References